Idrizovo is a settlement in the outskirts of the city of Skopje within the municipality of Gazi Baba, Republic of North Macedonia.

Demographics
According to the 2021 census, the village had a total of 1.824 inhabitants. Ethnic groups in the village include:
Macedonians 826
Albanians 747
Persons for whom data are taken from administrative sources 162
Bosniaks 29
Turks 15
Romani 11
Serbs 9
Others 25

Correctional facility
With the establishment of the Socialist Federal Republic of Yugoslavia following the Second World War, an internment camp was built in the area wherein political prisoners could be detained. Today, the prison remains and serves as one of the largest correctional facilities in the country. Known as Kolonija Idrizovo the correctional facility had a population of 451 (2002 census) and included the following ethnic groups:

Macedonians 401
Albanians 35
Turks 4
Romani 2
Serbs 8 
Others 1

References

External links

Villages in Gazi Baba Municipality
Albanian communities in North Macedonia